The order of battle for the Battle of the Scheldt lists the Allied and German forces that participated in said World War II battle from October 2 to November 8, 1944.

See also 

List of orders of battle

References

Further reading 
Brown, Angus and Gimblett, Richard, In the Footsteps of First Canadian Army: Northwest Europe 1942–1945. Magic Light Publishing, 2009, 
Copp, Terry, Cinderella Army: The Canadians in Northwest Europe 1944–1945. University of Toronto Press, 2007. 
Zuehlke, Mark, Terrible Victory: First Canadian Army and the Scheldt Estuary Campaign: September 13 – November 6, 1944. Douglas & McIntyre, 2009. 

World War II orders of battle